European Championship D is the fourth tier of the rugby league European Championships. It was founded in 2020 as part of a major restructure of the competition across Europe.

Team appearances

Results

Summary

See also

 Rugby League European Championship A
 Rugby League European Championship B
 Rugby League European Championship C
 Women's Rugby League European Championship
 Wheelchair Rugby League European Championship

References 

European rugby league competitions
Rugby league international tournaments